The Repše cabinet was the government of Latvia from 7 November 2002 to 9 March 2004 when the government announced a resignation.

Government of Latvia
2002 establishments in Latvia
2003 in Latvia
2004 disestablishments in Latvia
Cabinets established in 2002
Cabinets disestablished in 2004